4-Methoxyestriol (4-MeO-E3) is an endogenous estrogen metabolite. It is the 4-methyl ether of 4-hydroxyestriol and a metabolite of estriol and 4-hydroxyestriol. 4-Methoxyestriol has very low affinities for the estrogen receptors. Its relative binding affinities (RBAs) for estrogen receptor alpha (ERα) and estrogen receptor beta (ERβ) are both about 1% of those of estradiol. For comparison, estriol had RBAs of 11% and 35%, respectively.

See also
 2-Methoxyestradiol
 2-Methoxyestriol
 2-Methoxyestrone
 4-Methoxyestradiol
 4-Methoxyestrone

References

Estranes
Ethers
Human metabolites
Phenols